SCSU may refer to:

 St. Cloud State University
 Scarborough Campus Students' Union at the University of Toronto Scarborough
 Sheffield College Student Union
 South Carolina State University
 Southern Connecticut State University
 Standard Compression Scheme for Unicode